Piotr Włodzimierz Kozieradzki (born 23 May 1970, Warsaw), also known as Mitloff, is a Polish musician and drummer. He has contributed to bands such as Riverside, Hate, Thunderbolt, Kataxu, Goetia, Dark Prophecies, and Domain.

Piotr Kozieradzki is endorsed by Czarcie Kopyto and Paiste. He also uses DW drums, Remo drumheads, and Pearl hardware.

Since 2010 owns and runs ProgTeam Management.

Discography

References

External links

 Riverside homepage

Polish heavy metal drummers
Male drummers
Living people
1970 births
Death metal musicians
21st-century drummers
21st-century male musicians